Jens Essendrop (24 November 1723 – 12 December 1801) was a Norwegian clergyman, mining official and topographical writer. He was born in Christiania, a son of priest Søren Essendrop and Pauline Holst. He served as mining officer in Kongsberg from 1771. His work Physisk Oeconomisk Beskrivelse over Lier Præstegield introduced the topographical descriptions of parishes as a literary genre in Norway, and became a model for succeeding writers.

References

1723 births
1801 deaths
Clergy from Oslo
Writers from Oslo
Civil servants from Oslo